Aleksander Uurits (May 12, 1888 in Tallinn – August 10, 1918 in Velikiye Luki) was an Estonian painter and graphic artist. Uurits was a student Ants Laikmaa, an Estonian painter and activist organizer.

References

1888 births
1918 deaths
Artists from Tallinn
People from the Governorate of Estonia
20th-century Estonian painters
20th-century Estonian male artists
Estonian illustrators